The Santosham Best Actress Award is given by the Santosham Film magazine as part of its annual Santosham Film Awards for Telugu films. The award was first given to Asin in 2003. Here is a list of the award winners and the films for which they won.

Superlatives

Winners

References

Santosham Film Awards
Film awards for lead actress